The Fairmont St. Andrews Bay is a 5-star resort hotel situated  outside the town of St. Andrews in Fife, Scotland. The hotel is managed by Fairmont Hotels and Resorts and owned by a company led by Great Century.

Overview

History
The £50 million resort opened in June 2001 as St. Andrews Bay Golf Resort & Spa owned by US entrepreneur Don Panoz, as part of the Château Élan Hotels & Resorts consortium. In 2006 the resort was bought by Apollo Real Estate Advisors (renamed AREA Property Partners) and is now managed by FRHI Hotels & Resorts. This prompted a name change to Fairmont St Andrews Bay.

In August 2014 it was announced Kennedy Wilson Real Estate PLC had purchased the property, with FRHI Hotel & Resorts continuing to manage the hotel and its operations.

Refurbishment
In 2008-9 the resort underwent a £17 million renovation, with all 209 guest rooms and the Signature Spa refurbished. The public areas were also upgraded, including the lobby, corridors, atrium and Kittocks Bar. The Rock and Spindle bar had been opened the previous year, and the conference center had also been refurbished. 
At this time the two golf courses were also altered and the Devlin Course was renamed the Kittocks Course.

In 2017, Fairmont St. Andrews Bay underwent another multi-million pound renovation. Managed by designers RPW, the redevelopment was influenced by the history and landscapes of St Andrews and involved a complete redesign of the hotel’s atrium.

Resort Facilities

Rooms

The resort has 211 bedrooms including 17 suites and 2 external manor homes. The hotel has four types of suites: Studio, Junior, Deluxe and Executive as well as the Kingdom of Fife Suite, the hotel’s largest accommodation.

Restaurants
The resort has six dining outlets which offer a variety of cuisines.

La Cucina is an Italian eatery offering simple dishes. The menu focuses on antipasti, pizza and pasta, daily specials, seafood, fish, and meats.
The Squire is the hotel’s main restaurant, named after golf legend Gene Sarazen. It is a contemporary brasserie-style restaurant and the Table d’Hôte menu changes seasonally.
The St. Andrews Bar & Grill serves breakfast, lunch and dinner with views of the golf courses and the bay of St. Andrews.
Zephyr Sports Bar is a luxury sports bar, showing televised live sports, as well as boasting a pool table, dart board and foosball.
Kittocks Den is a lobby bar, serving cocktails, liquors and whisky as well as lunch and supper.
The Atrium Lounge - Savoy Afternoon Tea

Conference Facilities
The conference center has twelve meeting rooms, a ballroom, and a cinema. The  meeting space is flexible and caters for 12 to 600 people.

Leisure Facilities

Golf

The Torrance Course is a Par 72, 7,230 yard long championship course, originally designed by golfer Gene Sarazen and former European Ryder Cup Captain Sam Torrance. In 2009 the course was redesigned to include eight new holes, in preparation for the 2009 Scottish Seniors Open and was also the Final Qualifying Venue for the 2010 Open Golf Championship. In August 2010 the World Deaf Golf Championships and the Scottish Seniors Open 2010 were held on the Torrance. The course features classic Scottish riveted bunkering throughout and is of a Scottish style Links design. In 2021 and 2022, the course hosted the Hero Open tournament.

The Kittocks Course is 7,192 yard long and is a Par 72. Its original architects were Gene Sarazen and Bruce Devlin which is why it was formerly known as the Devlin Course 2012.
The name Kittocks is taken from the SSSI (Site of Special Scientific Interest) area of land on the course which is inhabited by a family of deer.

Spa
The  health spa is situated on the ground floor of the hotel. Its facilities include a 16-metre swimming pool, a spa bath, a sauna and a steam room as well as a fitness studio.

Fife Coastal Path
The Fife Coastal Path is a long distance footpath that runs along the coast just below the golf courses at the Fairmont St. Andrews Bay.

Gallery

References

External links

St Andrews
St Andrews
Hotels in Fife
Hotel buildings completed in 2001
Hotels established in 2001
2001 establishments in Scotland